Kálmán Nádasdy (25 November 1904 – 17 April 1980) was a Hungarian film director. In 1959, he was a member of the jury at the 1st Moscow International Film Festival. His son is Ádám Nádasdy.

Selected filmography
 The Armchair (1939)
 Gül Baba (1940)
 Magdolna (1942)
 Lúdas Matyi (1950)

Bibliography
 Burns, Bryan. World Cinema: Hungary. Fairleigh Dickinson University Press, 1996.
 Cunningham, John. Hungarian Cinema: From Coffee House to Multiplex. Wallflower Press, 2004.

References

External links

1904 births
1980 deaths
Hungarian film directors
Film people from Budapest